SS Winifredian was a passenger liner launched in 1899 for Leyland Line service between Liverpool and Boston. She carried a number of British officers and troops from Cape Town to Southampton in September 1902 at the end of the Second Boer War and served as a troopship thru World War I from 1914 to 1919. Her final voyages were between Antwerp and New York City for the Red Star Line in 1927.

Citations 

Ocean liners
1899 ships